So Red the Rose is the only studio album by the Duran Duran-spinoff group Arcadia, released in 1985. It included the singles "Election Day", "Goodbye Is Forever" and "The Flame". The album peaked at #23 on the Billboard 200 in January 1986 and at #30 on the UK Albums charts in December 1985.

There were many musical guests on the album, including David Gilmour of Pink Floyd, Herbie Hancock, Grace Jones, and Sting (who provided backing vocals on "The Promise").

The album's artwork featured painted ink drawings by fashion illustrator Tony Viramontes of fashion model Violeta Sanchez as well as an innovative "light space" photograph of the band by Dean Chamberlain, who also directed the video for the song "Missing." Nick Rhodes said of the model Sanchez on the album cover, "She had an elegance to her, an old style classic beauty".

Box sets
As part of EMI's massive Duran Duran reissue plans, a jewel case 3 disc (2CD, 1 DVD) boxset of So Red the Rose was released 12 April 2010. It included the entire album, single mixes, the B-sides "She's Moody and Grey, She's Mean and She's Restless" and "Flame Game (Yo Homeboy Mix)", four versions of non-album track "Say the Word" (a track from the soundtrack of Playing for Keeps), and an instrumental mix of "The Promise". The DVD contains the original 1987 video release Arcadia.

But in 2008 a previously existing, more complete LIMITED EDITION for Japan fan club (23-track digitally) was remastered into 6 CD single set, comprising all the singles ever released for the Arcadia project ('So Red the Rose' album LP), also including 'Say the Word'. The packaging is a 'so red the velvet', faithfully replicating the original single sleeve artwork, plus 8-page fold-out picture booklet of lyrics and biography.

Encrypted messages
Some versions of the album and related singles contained a numeric code in their artwork, this code allocated even numbers to letters, beginning with 16=A, and continuing to 52=S, and then wrapping around to 02=T up to 14=Z. 00 represents either a space or a mid-word capitalization (being used before the "B" in LeBon).  The numbers on the front cover of the US CD release decode to spell TAYLOR RHODES LE BON (the surnames of the three members of the group). The circular image on the back of the CD insert spells SO RED THE ROSE both forward and backward, while the three letters in the center are T R L (Taylor/Rhodes/LeBon)

Track listing

1985 original release
All songs written by Simon Le Bon, Nick Rhodes and Roger Taylor, except where noted.
 "Election Day" – 5:29
 "Keep Me in the Dark" – 4:31
 "Goodbye Is Forever" – 3:49
 "The Flame" – 4:23
 "Missing" – 3:40 (LeBon, Rhodes)
 "Rose Arcana" – 0:51 (LeBon, Rhodes)
 "The Promise" – 7:30
 "El Diablo" – 6:05
 "Lady Ice" – 7:32 (LeBon, Rhodes)

2010 reissue

CD1
 "Election Day" – 5:29
 "Keep Me in the Dark" – 4:31
 "Goodbye Is Forever" – 3:49
 "The Flame" – 4:23
 "Missing" – 3:40 (LeBon, Rhodes)
 "Rose Arcana" – 0:51 (LeBon, Rhodes)
 "The Promise" – 7:30
 "El Diablo" – 6:05
 "Lady Ice" – 7:32 (LeBon, Rhodes)
 "Say the Word" (7" edit) – 4:30 (LeBon, Rhodes)
 "Election Day" (Single Version) – 4:31
 "Goodbye Is Forever" (Single Mix) – 4:17
 "The Promise" (7" Mix) – 4:46
 "The Flame" (7" Remix) – 4:06
 "Say the Word" – 5:08
 "She's Moody and Grey She's Mean and Restless" – 4:29

CD2
 "Election Day" (Consensus mix) – 8:39
 "Goodbye Is Forever" (12" Extended Mix) –	6:45
 "The Promise" (Instrumental) – 5:44
 "Rose Arcana" – 5:33
 "The Flame" (Extended Remix) – 7:17
 "Say the Word" (Extended Vocal Remix) – 6:33
 "Election Day" (Cryptic Cut) – 9:09
 "The Promise" (12" Mix) – 7:06
 "Goodbye Is Forever" (Dub Mix) – 5:15
 "Say the Word" (Extended Instrumental Remix) – 5:48
 "Election Day" (Early Rough Mix) – 9:04
 "Flame Game" (Yo Homeboy Mix) – 2:51

DVD
 "Introduction"
 "Filming Election Day"
 "Election Day"
 "Filming The Promise"
 "The Promise"
 "Filming Goodbye Is Forever"
 "Goodbye Is Forever"
 "Filming The Flame"
 "The Flame"
 "Filming Missing"
 "Missing"
 "Credits"

Singles
 "Election Day" (October 1985)
 "Goodbye Is Forever" (January 1986)
 "The Promise" (January 1986)
 "The Flame" (July 1986)

Personnel
Arcadia
 Simon Le Bon – vocals
 Nick Rhodes – keyboards
 Roger Taylor – drums

Additional musicians
Mark Egan – bass
Masami Tsuchiya – guitar
Carlos Alomar, David Gilmour – additional guitar
Sting – additional vocals on "The Promise"
Grace Jones – additional vocals on "Election Day" 
Herbie Hancock – additional keyboards on "The Promise"
Andy Mackay – saxophone
Steve Jordan – additional drums on "Lady Ice"
David Van Tieghem, Manu Katché, Rafael De Jesus – additional percussion
Wendel Jr. (Percussion Replacement System) – drum programming
Jean-Claude Dubois – harp
Masami Tsuchiya, Pierre Defay – violin

Production
Produced By Alex Sadkin & Arcadia
Recorded By Larry Alexander; assisted by Phillippe Lafont
Engineered By Larry Alexander
Mixed By Larry Alexander, Phil Burnett, Nick Delre, Billy Miranda & Ron Saint-Germain
Mastered By Bob Ludwig
Album cover illustration by Tony Viramontes

References

External links
[ "So Red the Rose" at allmusic]
"So Red the Rose" at discogs

1985 debut albums
Albums produced by Alex Sadkin
Parlophone albums
Capitol Records albums
Arcadia (band) albums